Volodymyr Volodymyrovych Hashchyn (born 2 January 1972) is a retired Soviet and Ukrainian professional footballer.

References

External links
 

1972 births
Living people
People from Novovolynsk
Piddubny Olympic College alumni
Soviet footballers
Ukrainian footballers
Ukrainian expatriate footballers
Expatriate footballers in Poland
Association football midfielders
FC Volyn Lutsk players
FC CSKA Kyiv players
KSZO Ostrowiec Świętokrzyski players
FC Dnipro players
FC Metalurh Novomoskovsk players
FC Nyva Vinnytsia players
FC Kryvbas Kryvyi Rih players
FC Zirka Kropyvnytskyi players
FC Zirka-2 Kirovohrad players
FC Oleksandriya players
FC Ikva Mlyniv players
FC Kovel-Volyn Kovel players
Ukrainian Premier League players
Ukrainian football managers
Sportspeople from Volyn Oblast